Mehran Spice & Food Industries is a food manufacturer based in Pakistan. Mehran offers packaged spices, rice, pickles, and sweet mixes.

History 
Mehran Spice & Food Industries was founded in 1975. In 2000, Mehran installed a rice plant from Germany. Mehran has production plants located in Pakistan, Saudi Arabia and Dubai, United Arab Emirates. Following is the list of Mehran plants in chronological order:

 1975 – Mehran Spice & Food Industries | S.I.T.E, Pakistan
 1988 – Pure Food Ltd | Jebel Ali Free Zone, Dubai
 2002 – Thar Roller Flour Mill Naukot | Tharparkar District, Pakistan
 2003 – Mehran Spice & Food Industries | Korangi Industrial Area, Karachi, Pakistan
 2007 – Gul Mohammed Spice Factory | Jeddah, Kingdom of Saudi Arabia

Mehran manufactures recipe mixes, straight spices, desserts, Arabic spice & herbs, pickles, chutneys, rice, pastes, poly-bag, ketchup, sauces, beverages & canned foods.

FPPCI has awarded Mehran Spice and Food Industries the 'Best Export Award' 33 times since 1984.

Gul Muhammad Lot is the chairman of Mehran Group of Industries.

References

External links
Mehran Group official website

Pakistani cuisine

Brand name condiments
Food manufacturers of Pakistan
Pakistani brands
1975 establishments in Pakistan
Manufacturing companies based in Karachi
Food and drink companies based in Karachi